Parliamentary elections are scheduled to be held in East Timor by 21 May 2023. The current governing coalition is a four-party government of Fretilin–PLP–KHUNTO–PD, whilst CNRT is in opposition and holds the executive branch.

Background 

Initially, after the 2018 East Timorse parliamentary election, the VIII Constitutional Government was drawn from and supported by a coalition known as the Alliance for Change and Progress (AMP), which was made up of the National Congress for Timorese Reconstruction (CNRT), the People's Liberation Party (PLP) and Kmanek Haburas Unidade Nasional Timor Oan (KHUNTO). Prime Minister Marí Bin Amude Alkatiri of Fretilin had to hand over his office to Taur Matan Ruak of the PLP. However, a large number of the candidates nominated by the CNRT for government posts were refused appointment by President Francisco Guterres (FRETILIN), as he considered them unsuitable for various reasons. Taur Matan Ruak managed to form a cabinet anyway by having the vacant positions of the missing CNRT members co-administered by other government members. In the National Parliament, the AMP denied the opposition parties Fretilin and Partido Democrático (PD) adequate participation in the presidium and in the management of the committees, which led to further conflicts.

In 2020, CNRT MPs increasingly blamed Prime Minister Taur Matan Ruak for the fact that most of the CNRT ministers were still not in office after 18 months. On 17 January, the government's budget proposal failed because CNRT MPs abstained. Taur Matan Ruak therefore declared the end of the AMP, but President Guterres asked him to continue leading the government for the time being. On 22 February, CNRT, KHUNTO, PD, Timorese Democratic Union (UDT), Frenti-Mudança (FM) and United Party for Development and Democracy (PUDD) signed a coalition agreement to form a new government. However, Guterres again did not accept Taur Matan Ruak's request to resign two days later and instead asked him to continue leading the transitional government. With the outbreak of the COVID-19 pandemic in East Timor at the end of March, another crisis hit the country. KHUNTO then declared that it would now support Taur Matan Ruak again, and he withdrew his request for resignation on 8 April. The proposal of the Six Party Alliance to appoint Gusmão as Prime Minister was not answered by President Guterres. On 27 April, the coalition lost a vote in parliament on the state of emergency over COVID-19, as PLP, KHUNTO, and Fretilin voted unanimously. This was the end of the coalition, and the VIII government now included Fretilin representatives in the cabinet, as well as Júlio Sarmento da Costa of the PD, who now also supported the government. Parliamentary Speaker Arão Noé da Costa Amaral of the CNRT was replaced by Aniceto Guterres Lopes of Fretilin and the committee boards were reconstituted, now excluding the CNRT.

Following the breakdown of the AMP coalition during the first few months of 2020, a new governing coalition took place in the form of four-party government of Fretilin–PLP–KHUNTO–PD on 12 May 2020, new officials were appointed on 29 May and 24 June 2020.

Presidential elections were held on 19 March 2022. Incumbent Francisco Guterres sought election to a second term. As none of the presidential nominees received at least 50% of the cast votes, a runoff was held on 19 April 2022, between the top two candidates, José Ramos-Horta and Guterres. Ramos-Horta won the runoff with 62.1% of the total votes cast. The election marked the first time that someone had been re-elected to the East Timorese presidency (albeit to a non-consecutive term), as well as the second time that an incumbent president had been defeated – after the 2012 election, when Ramos-Horta was eliminated in the first round. Former President José Ramos-Horta came out of retirement as he stated that incumbent president Francisco “Lu-Olo” Guterres had violated the constitution. Guterres had previously refused to swear in several ministers from Ramos-Horta's party on the grounds that they were currently undergoing legal investigations over corruption. Ramos-Horta stated that in the event of winning the presidential election, he would potentially dissolve parliament and call for new elections. Ramos-Horta, who always sought a balance between the political parties in his speeches, remained vague in his comments on his post-election plans. Ramos-Horta ran on a platform of poverty reduction, increasing healthcare services for mothers and children, as well as increasing job creation. He also stated that he wanted to try and improve communication across the governing political parties for the purposes of increasing stability. In addition, Ramos-Horta stated his intention on working with the government to address supply chain issues from the ongoing COVID-19 pandemic and war in Ukraine. After his victory over incumbent Guterres, Ramos-Horta declared that he would support the VIII government until the end of its mandate.

In November 2022, Ramos-Horta had initially set the regular new elections for parliament for 20 February 2023. But a discussion then broke out about the exact timing and convenience of the election date. Finally, President Ramos-Horta announced 21 May as the election date. This would allow the final results to be announced in June and the new parliament to take office at the same time as the parliamentarians for the 2018 legislature which then on was 12 June (the new government was sworn in on 21 June). In addition, the 2024 national budget could be passed in time, which would avoid various problems, and the ASEAN summit will be held in September to admit East Timor as an official member. Fretilin had proposed a date in the second half of the year.

Electoral system 
The 65 members of the National Parliament were elected from a single nationwide constituency by closed list proportional representation. Parties were required to have a woman in at least every third position in their list. Seats were allocated using the d'Hondt method with an electoral threshold of four percent. Voters had to cast their ballots in their home municipality, which meant that many residents of the capital Dili had to travel to their homes on election day. Following experience in the last presidential elections, a voting centre is now to be opened in Dili for each East Timorese municipality in the parliamentary elections as well, in order to save voters the trip. The Secretáriado Técnico de Administração Eleitoral (STAE) plans to provide a total of 1500 polling centres and 1880 polling stations in the country.

References

Bibliography

2023 in East Timor
East Timor
Elections in East Timor